The Marismeño is a rare breed of horse indigenous to the marshes of the Guadalquivir River, from which it takes its name. It is now found particularly in the Doñana National Park, which lies mostly in the province of Huelva, in Andalusia, southwestern Spain. Until recently it was not considered a breed; recognition and recovery began in 2003. It is listed in the Catálogo Oficial de Razas de Ganado de España in the group of autochthonous breeds in danger of extinction.

See also
Iberian horse
Sorraia

References

Horse breeds
Horse breeds originating in Spain